The National Pollutant Inventory (NPI) is a database of Australian pollution emissions managed by the Australian Commonwealth, State and Territory Governments.  A condensed version of the information collected is available to the public via the NPI website www.npi.gov.au.

Emissions
The NPI records and makes publicly available the emissions from industrial facilities and diffuse sources of 93 different chemical substances to air, land and water.

Objectives
The objectives of the NPI are to:
 Assist industry and government with environmental planning and management;
 Provide the community with up to date information about pollutant emissions from industrial facilities; and
 Promote waste minimisation, cleaner production, eco-efficiency and energy and resource efficiency.

Sources of data
Australian industrial facilities that use certain amounts of the 93 NPI substances must estimate and report their emissions directly to their state or territory environment agency annually. The state and territory environment agencies review all NPI reports for accuracy and forward
the data to the Australian Government. The reports are then displayed on the NPI public website

Exemptions 
The following industrial activities are exempt from the NPI's mandatory reporting requirements:
 Mobile emission sources (for example, an aircraft in flight or a ship at sea) operating outside the boundaries of a fixed facility
 Petrol stations
 Dry cleaners which employ less than 20 people
 Scrap metal handling facilities that do not reprocess batteries or engage in metal smelting
 Agricultural production facilities, including the growing of trees, aquaculture, horticulture or livestock raising unless it involves intensive livestock production (for example, a piggery, poultry farm or a cattle feedlot) or processing agricultural produce.
During a review of the NPI undertaken in 2005, it was suggested that two industries have their exemptions lifted. They were aquaculture, and crematoria. Reasons given were for their discharges of nutrient to the sea, and mercury to the atmosphere respectively. In 2007, Environment Ministers voted against the lifting of the reporting exemption for aquaculture, despite the review receiving 12 submissions supporting the recommendation, and 5 opposing it.

Aquaculture in Spencer Gulf 

This omission of the aquaculture industry from mandatory reporting is significant for Spencer Gulf, South Australia. In this region, southern bluefin tuna and yellowtail kingfish sea-cage aquaculture are the two largest industrial contributors of nitrogenous nutrient pollution to the marine environment. The Spencer Gulf is particularly vulnerable to impacts because its water exchange with the ocean is constrained and the waters are naturally very low in nutrients by world standards. The existing marine communities have evolved to these unique circumstances, and are therefore particularly susceptible to changes in their environment. Iconic marine species of the region include the giant Australian cuttlefish and the little penguin, both of which are in decline.

Substances reported
 1,1,1,2-Tetrachloroethane
 1,1,2-Trichloroethane
 1,2-Dibromoethane
 1,2-Dichloroethane
 1,3-Butadiene (vinyl ethylene) 
 2-Ethoxyethanol acetate
 2-Ethoxyethanol
 2-Methoxyethanol acetate
 2-Methoxyethanol
 4,4'-Methylene-bis(2-chloroaniline)
 Acetaldehyde 
 Acetic acid (ethanoic acid) 
 Acetone
 Acetonitrile
 Acrolein
 Acrylamide
 Acrylic acid
 Acrylonitrile (2-propenenitrile) 
 Ammonia  (total)
 Aniline (benzenamine) 
 Antimony & compounds
 Arsenic & compounds
 Benzene
 Benzene hexachloro- (HCB) 
 Beryllium & compounds
 Biphenyl (1,1-biphenyl) 
 Boron & compounds
 Cadmium & compounds
 Carbon disulfide
 Carbon monoxide
 Chlorine dioxide
 Chlorine & compounds
 Chloroethane (ethyl chloride) 
 Chloroform (trichloromethane) 
 Chlorophenols (di, tri, tetra) 
 Chromium (tri)
 Chromium (hexa)
 Cobalt & compounds
 Copper & compounds
 Cumene (1-methylethylbenzene) 
 Cyanide (inorganic) compounds
 Cyclohexane
 Di-(2-Ethylhexyl) phthalate (DEHP) 
 Dibutyl phthalate
 Dichloromethane
 Ethanol
 Ethyl acetate
 Ethyl butyl ketone
 Ethylbenzene
 Ethylene glycol (1,2-ethanediol) 
 Ethylene oxide
 Fluoride compounds
 Formaldehyde (methyl aldehyde) 
 Glutaraldehyde
 Hydrochloric acid
 Hydrogen sulfide
 Lead & compounds
 Magnesium oxide
 Manganese & compounds
 Mercury & compounds
 Methanol
 Methylene diphenyl diisocyanate
 Methyl ethyl ketone
 Methyl isobutyl ketone
 Methyl methacrylate
 n-Hexane
 Nickel carbonyl
 Nickel subsulfide
 Nickel & compounds
 Nitric acid
 Organo-tin
 Oxides of nitrogen
 Particulate Matter <2.5 μm PM2.5
 Particulate Matter <10 μm PM10
 Phenol
 Phosphoric acid
 Phosphorus
 Polychlorinated Biphenyls
 Polychlorinated dioxins and furans
 Polycyclic aromatic hydrocarbons
 Selenium & compounds
 Styrene (ethenylbenzene) 
 Sulfur dioxide
 Sulfuric acid
 Tetrachloroethylene
 Toluene (methylbenzene) 
 Toluene-2,4-diisocyanate
 Total Nitrogen
 Total Phosphorus
 Total Volatile Organic Compounds
 Trichloroethylene
 Vinyl Chloride Monomer
 Xylenes (individual or mixed isomers) 
 Zinc & compounds

External links
National Pollutant Inventory
The National Pollutant Inventory in Google Earth
 Environment Canada National Pollutant Release Inventory
 US EPA Toxics Release Inventory
 Mexican Registro de Emisiones y Transferencia de Contaminantes
 European Pollutant Emission Register
 North American Commission for Environmental Cooperation Pollutant Release and Transfer Registers (PRTR) page

References 

Government databases in Australia
Pollutant release inventories and registers
Pollution in Australia